The 1979–80 Elitserien season was the fifth season of the Elitserien, the top level of ice hockey in Sweden. 10 teams participated in the league, and Brynas IF won the championship.

Standings

Playoffs

External links
 Swedish Hockey League official site

Swedish Hockey League seasons
1979–80 in Swedish ice hockey
Swedish